Nebria orestias is a species of ground beetle in the Nebriinae subfamily that can be found in Tibet, and in the Indian state of Sikkim, and Darjeeling district.

References

orestias
Beetles described in 1932
Beetles of Asia